Peter Brown (born 15 November 1963) is a former Australian rules footballer who played for St Kilda in the Victorian Football League (VFL) in 1985-86. He was recruited from the Boronia Football Club in the Eastern District Football League (EDFL).

References

External links

1963 births
Living people
St Kilda Football Club players
Australian rules footballers from Victoria (Australia)